Acinopterus angulatus, the angulate leafhopper, is a species of leafhopper in the family Cicadellidae.

References

Acinopterini
Articles created by Qbugbot
Insects described in 1922